Billboard Top Rock'n'Roll Hits: 1963 is a compilation album released by Rhino Records in 1988, featuring 10 hit recordings from 1963.

The album includes eight songs that reached the top of the Billboard Hot 100 chart, including the year's No. 1 song, "Sugar Shack" by Jimmy Gilmer and The Fireballs. The remaining three tracks each reached the Hot 100's Top 5 with 	"Fingertips - Pt. 2" and "Louie Louie" each peaking at No. 2 while "Surfin' U.S.A." topped out at No. 3.

Rhino re-issued the album with a revised track lineup in 1993. Two tracks on the original 1988 release—"Fingertips" by "Little" Stevie Wonder and "Walk Like a Man" by The 4 Seasons—were replaced on the re-issue with "If You Wanna Be Happy" by Jimmy Soul and "Deep Purple" by Nino Tempo & April Stevens. Both of the replacement songs reached No. 1 on the Hot 100 chart.

The album was certified Gold by the RIAA on October 30, 1997.

Reception
"Another winner in this series" with "All original versions and excellent transfers" - Cub Koda, AllMusic Review

Track listing
Track information and credits taken from the album's liner notes.

References

1988 compilation albums
Billboard Top Rock'n'Roll Hits albums
Pop rock compilation albums